Phacellus plurimaculatus is a species of beetle in the family Cerambycidae. It was described by Galileo and Martins in 2001. It is known from Brazil.

References

Phacellini
Beetles described in 2001